Jerald Scott Paul (born 1966 in Lancaster, Ohio) is the current President of Maine Maritime Academy and holds the rank of Rear Admiral in the United States Maritime Service. He previously served as the Principal Deputy Administrator of the National Nuclear Security Administration at the U.S. Department of Energy.  He was nominated by President George W. Bush and was confirmed by the U.S. Senate in July 2004. He oversaw all of this agency's nuclear nonproliferation programs with the principal responsibility of preventing the spread of nuclear materials, technology and expertise. In August 2006, Paul stepped down from this position to return to his law practice.

Jerald Paul previously served as a Representative in the House of Representatives of the U.S. state of Florida. He earned a B.S. degree in marine engineering from the Maine Maritime Academy in 1989 and then enrolled at the University of Florida, taking graduate level courses in nuclear engineering until December 1990. Paul received his Juris Doctor from the Stetson University in December 1994.

References

External links
Paul named Deputy Administrator
Official Website of Paul

1966 births
Living people
People from Lancaster, Ohio
Maine Maritime Academy alumni
University of Florida alumni
Stetson University College of Law alumni
Republican Party members of the Florida House of Representatives